Nutcracker is a 1982 British drama film directed by Anwar Kawadri and starring Joan Collins, Carol White and Paul Nicholas. Set during the Cold War, the story concerns a Soviet ballerina who attempts to defect to the West and settle in London.

Cast
 Joan Collins as Laura Carrere 
 Carol White as Margaux Lasselle 
 Paul Nicholas as Mike McCann 
 Finola Hughes as Nadia Gargarin 
 William Franklyn as Sir Arthur Cartwright 
 Leslie Ash as Sharon 
 Murray Melvin as Leopold 
 Vernon Dobtcheff as Markovitch
 Geraldine Gardner as Markova 
 Cherry Gillespie as Mireille 
 Jane Wellman as Grace 
 Ed Bishop as Sam Dozier 
 Jo Warne as Madame Olga 
 Martin Burrows as Tom 
 Fran Fullenwider as Vi 
 Anna Bergman as Tashi 
 Nicola Austin as Sylvie 
 Olivier Pierre as Alex Lasalle 
 Steve Kelly as Boris
 Richard Marner as Popov
 Morgan Sheppard as George Peacock

References

Bibliography
 Upton, Julian. Fallen Stars: Tragic Lives and Lost Careers. Headpress/Critical Vision, 2004.

External links

1982 films
1982 drama films
British drama films
Films about ballet
Cold War films
Films set in London
1984 drama films
1984 films
1980s English-language films
1980s British films